Citrinarchis is a genus of moths of the family Yponomeutidae.

Species
Citrinarchis oxyphanta - Meyrick, 1938 

Yponomeutidae